Hutt River may refer to:

 Hutt River, New Zealand
 Hutt River (South Australia)
 Hutt River (Western Australia)
 Principality of Hutt River, a micronation in Western Australia

See also 
 Hutt (disambiguation)
 Eastern Hutt River
 Western Hutt River